Sand-e Hamzeh (also Romanized as Sand-e Ḩamzeh and Sand Ḩamzeh; also known as Sand) is a village in Sand-e Mir Suiyan Rural District, Dashtiari District, Chabahar County, Sistan and Baluchestan Province, Iran. At the 2006 census, its population was 534, in 88 families.

References 

Populated places in Chabahar County